Westville is an area in KwaZulu-Natal, South Africa, and is just west and inland of Durban. It was a formerly independent town however it became part of the eThekwini Metropolitan Municipality in 2002. Westville is situated 10 km inland from the Durban CBD. The climate is subtropical; Westville experiences mild, dry winters, and hot, humid summers with frequent later afternoon downpours. 

Westville is also central to a few townships, namely Cato Manor, Clermont and Chesterville.

History
The settlement began in 1847 as the farm Westville (named in honour of Martin West, the first British lieutenant-governor of what was then the province of Natal). In March 1848 a group of Germans, brought out by Jonas Bergtheil, arrived in Port Natal to settle the area and farm cotton. They established several farms both in Westville and neighbouring New Germany (the two settlements are separated by the Palmiet Valley), and were a tight-knit community. The Westville settlers would travel through Palmiet Valley on Sundays to attend the Lutheran Church in New Germany. When their cotton crops failed the first year, settlers were granted permission to farm other crops like potatoes, mielies (corn), barley and oats. The city of Durban provided a ready market for their produce.   

The 'German House' owned by the Lange family on what is today Jan Hofmeyr Road became an important stopover for those travelling the Old Main Road between Durban and Pietermaritzburg. The Outspan Tree alongside the hostelry is now a national monument. The Bergtheil Museum, located on what is today 16 Queen's Avenue, was built in the 1840s and is the oldest remaining house in Westville. It offers visitors an idea of early settler dwellings and farming practices.

The 1850s saw the addition of Scottish and English settlers to Westville. In the 1870s, Indian market gardeners moved into the area too. In time, the German settlers integrated with other settlers and began to speak English.

Westville was proclaimed a borough in 1956. It was incorporated into eThekwini as part of the post-apartheid reorganisation of South Africa's municipalities.

Geography 
Westville is located an elevation of between 107m and 300m above sea level on the undulating rolling hills in the Inner West region of eThekwini between the uMbilo River to the south and the Palmiet River and Reservoir Hills to the north. 

Westville is bordered by the city of Durban to the east and north (Reservoir Hills), Queensburgh to the south, Clermont to the north-west and Pinetown to the west.

Suburban areas 

Westville's Central Business District (CBD) is located to the western boundary of Westville to the south of the M13 highway and mainly concentrated around its main road, Westville Road as well as Church Road. 

Westville consists of 6 suburban areas including:

 Atholl Heights is Westville's northernmost suburb lying north of the M19 highway and bordering with neighbouring suburbs of Clermont and Reservoir Hills.

 Berea West is situated on the western boundary of Westville bordering the N2 highway to the west and the N3 highway to the south. The suffix "West" was added to the suburb to differentiate from the suburb of Berea in Durban approximately 6 km to the west.

 Chiltern Hills is situated on the western boundary of Westville and in the northern suburbs of Westville. It is bordered by the M19 highway to the north.

 Dawncliffe, the largest suburb in Westville which is situated towards the south of the town, with a small portion of the suburb lying south of the CBD and north of the N3 highway and most of the suburb lying to the south of the N3 highway.

 Dawncrest is sandwiched between Grayleigh, Chiltern Hills and Berea West and is located north of the M13 highway. 

 Grayleigh is situated on the eastern boundary of Westville and north of the Westville CBD and the M13 highway. 

The northern suburbs of Westville including Atholl Heights, Chiltern Hills, Grayleigh and Dawncrest are collectively known as "Westville North"

The remainder of Westville includes the Westville Prison in the south of the town as well as the area located on the eastern boundary between Berea West and Dawncrest which falls under Westville proper.

Education
Schools situated in Westville include Star College Durban Westville Boys' High School, Westville Girls' High School, Atholl Heights Primary School, Berea West Junior Primary School, Berea West Senior Primary School, Pitlochry Primary School, Westville Senior Primary and the Deutsche Schule Durban.
Higher education centres include a 2-square-kilometre campus of University of KwaZulu-Natal (formerly the University of Durban-Westville) and Varsity College (Westville campus).

Specialist schools such as The International Hotel School, based at the Westville Hotel, and The Fusion Cooking School can also be found in Westville.

Religions
There are several churches in Westville, including the Westville Methodist Church on 38 Jan Hofmeyr Road, Our Lady of Lourdes Catholic Church on 14 Westville Road, the Westville Baptist Church on 2 Church Place, St Elizabeth's Anglican Church on 45 Salisbury Avenue, and OneCity Church, which meets at the Westville Country Club. Mosques in Westville include Habibia Soofie Masjid, a Soofie mosque, on 119 Jan Hofmeyr Road, and the Westville Jaame Musjid on 46 Meerut Road.

Retail
Westville is one of the most important retail nodes or hubs in Greater Durban and has five shopping centre varying between large and small shopping centres. The shopping centres in Westville include:
 Westville Mall, which lies on Buckingham Terrace in the Westville CBD
Westville Junction Shopping Centre, which lies adjacent to and just below Westville Mall on Westville Road in the Westville CBD.
Westwood Mall, which lies on the eastern edge of Westville and alongside the M13 highway
 The Pavilion Shopping Mall, the largest shopping centre in Westville and the second largest in the Greater Durban area, after Gateway Theatre of Shopping in uMhlanga.

Business 
Westville boasts multiple business parks such as West Way Office Park and Essex Gardens amongst others, with others concentrated on Lancaster/Buckingham Terrace in Westville CBD and Essex Terrace and University Road near Westwood Mall. These business parks are home to small businesses and huge corporations alike, most notably the headquarters for companies such as RCL Foods, Boxer Superstores, The Unlimited insurance company, Vector Logistics and ESKOM's regional electricity supply offices.

Attractions
Tourist attractions include Palmiet Nature Reserve, which has 15 kilometres of guided and self-guided trails. Further afield tourists can experience the evergreen Western Inland Route and Natal's regional attractions, including the Drakensberg (Barrier of Spears) Battlefields Tours, game reserves and Zululand. A large Anglo-German Historical Route exists with numerous churches, museums and grave sites depicting the early settlement struggles of the early colonial days.

Infrastructure

Healthcare 

The only hospital in Westville is the Life Westville Hospital which is a private hospital owned by Life Healthcare Group. The hospital is located adjacent The Pavillion Shopping Centre on Harry Gwala Road to the south of the N3 in the Dawncliffe suburb of Westville.

Prison 

Westville Prison, which sits on the edge of Westville, is one of the largest prisons in the country and the only prison located in the Greater Durban area.

Road 
Westville has access to several major highways in the eThekwini Metro including the N3, N2, M13 and the M19. 

The N3 national highway is one of the main freeways running through Westville and runs towards the south of the town. The N3 links Westville to Pinetown and Pietermaritzburg in the north-west and Durban in the south-east. Access to Westville from the M3 can be obtained through the Harry Gwala Rd/St James Ave interchange (Exit 13) 

The N2 Outer Ring Road runs past Westville bordering the town to the east and separating it from the bordering city of Durban. The N2 highway links Westville to King Shaka International Airport and KwaDukuza in the north-east and Amanzimtoti and Port Shepstone in the south-west. Access from the N2 to Westville can be obtained through the N3 E.B. Cloete Interchange (Exit 165) to the east of Westville and the M19 Umgeni Road Interchange (Exit 170) in the neighbouring suburb of Reservoir Hills. 

The M13 King Cetshwayo Highway is the main highway running through Westville and an important commuter route linking the city of Durban to the neighbouring towns and suburbs to the west of the city. The metroplitan highway links Westville to Durban's suburb of Sherwood to the west, Durban's city centre in the south-west and the towns of Pinetown, Kloof, Gillitts and Hillcrest in the north-west. The M13 can be also used an alternative route to Pietermaritzburg for motorists avoiding the Mariannhill Toll Plaza in Pinetown. 

Access to Westville from the M13 is obtained through the University Road/Essex Terrace interchange (Exit 7), Rockdale Ave/Jan Hofmeyr Rd interchange (Exit 9), Queens Ave/Salisbury Ave interchange (Exit 10), Attercliffe Rd interchange (Exit 11) and the Rodger Sishi Rd/Westville Rd interchange. 

The M19 is a metropolitan highway that runs to the north of Westville and links Westville to New Germany/Pinetown in the north-west, Durban's suburbs of Reservoir Hills in the north and Springfield Park in the north-east. Access to Westville from the M19 can be obtained through the Rodger Sishi Rd/Dunkeld Rd interchange (Exit 10) and the Rodger Sishi Rd interchange (Exit 12) in New Germany. 

Another smaller arterial route in Westville is the metropolitan route of the M32 St James Ave/Attercliffe Rd/Jan Hofmeyr Rd/Rodger Sishi Rd which traverses throughout Westville from north to south and links the town to Durban in the south-west and New Germany in the north-west,

References 

Suburbs of Durban
German settlements in South Africa